Muradym (Moraźım) is a rural locality (a village) in Mikhaylovsky Selsoviet, Aurgazinsky District, Bashkortostan, Russia. The population was 773 as of 2010. There are 12 streets.

There are a secondary school, a medical outpatient clinic, a cultural center, a library and a mosque in the village.

Geography 
Muradym is located 29 km southwest of Tolbazy (the district's administrative centre) by road. Belyakovka is the nearest rural locality.

People 
 Fanuza Nadrshina (1936)- Bashkir folklorist, professor

References 

Rural localities in Aurgazinsky District